The 2020 Men's EuroHockey Club Trophy I would have been the 44th edition of the EuroHockey Club Trophy I, Europe's secondary men's club field hockey tournament organized by the European Hockey Federation and the first edition since it was renamed from the EuroHockey Club Trophy. It would be held in Vienna, Austria from 29 May to 1 June 2020.

The tournament was canceled on 23 March 2020 due to the COVID-19 pandemic.

Qualified teams
 Cardiff & Met
 Dinamo Elektrostal
 Grove Menzieshill
 Grunwald Poznań
 OKS Vinnitsa
 Post SV
 Rotweiss Wettingen
 Stroitel Brest

See also
2019–20 Euro Hockey League
2020 Men's EuroHockey Club Trophy II

References

Men's EuroHockey Club Trophy I
Club Trophy
EuroHockey Club Trophy I